The Doctor and The Devils is a 1985 British gothic horror film directed by Freddie Francis, and produced by Mel Brooks, through his production company Brooksfilms. It is based upon the true story of Burke and Hare, who in 1828 Edinburgh, Scotland, murdered at least 16 people and sold their bodies for anatomical dissection.

The film stars Timothy Dalton as Dr. Thomas Rock (a character based on the real-life Dr. Knox, to whom Burke and Hare supplied bodies) and features Jonathan Pryce and Stephen Rea as Fallon and Broom, characters based upon Burke and Hare. The film was directed by Freddie Francis, and features a script adapted by Sir Ronald Harwood from an unproduced screenplay by Dylan Thomas.

Plot

Dr. Thomas Rock (Timothy Dalton) is a respected 19th-century anatomist lecturing at a prominent medical school. He is deeply passionate about improving medical knowledge, a pursuit for which he believes "the ends justify the means." Unfortunately, due to the laws of the time very few cadavers are legally available to the medical profession, necessitating the use of body snatchers or "Resurrection men" by the medical establishment to procure additional specimens. Dr. Rock's young assistant Dr. Murray (Julian Sands) is given the task of buying the bodies, for which he is authorized to pay a small fortune, particularly for fresher corpses.

When alcoholic miscreants Fallon (Jonathan Pryce) and Broom (Stephen Rea) overhear details of the arrangement, they begin to murder the locals and sell their bodies. Gradually, Dr. Murray becomes more suspicious of the string of fresh bodies turning up at the medical school, but Dr. Rock dismisses his concerns. Meanwhile, Murray has begun to fall for beautiful local prostitute Jennie Bailey (Twiggy), who soon becomes the target of Fallon and Broom's murderous enterprise. When Jennie's friend Alice (Nichola McAuliffe) turns up dead in Dr. Rock's dissection room, Murray realizes what is happening and heroically rescues Jennie from a murderous Fallon. Both killers are soon arrested, but Broom agrees to turn state's evidence against his former partner, and is set free, unrepentant. Fallon is executed by hanging. Dr. Rock, for his part in the killings, is the subject of widespread public outrage, but ultimately not punished or censured by his colleagues.

The film ends with Rock pondering his responsibility for the horrors and concluding, "oh my God -- I knew what I was doing."

Cast

Production

Brooksfilms founder and executive producer Mel Brooks, a lifelong horror fan, acquired the rights to Dylan Thomas's unproduced screenplay The Doctor and the Devils (first published in 1953) in the hopes of adapting it into a horror film. He hired director and former cinematographer Freddie Francis, who during the 1960s and 70s had directed a series of horror films for famed British horror productions companies Hammer and Amicus. Brooks' original intention was to simply use the title of the Thomas screenplay, but Francis pushed for a closer adherence to the original script. A compromise was arranged with playwright and screenwriter Ronald Harwood adapting Thomas's more cerebral work into something more genre-friendly. Despite the adaptation, much of Thomas's original dialogue remains.

Reception

The film struggled to find an audience, and was not well received by critics. Roger Ebert gave the film one-and-a-half stars out of four, writing, "It is impossible to discover, on the evidence of "The Doctor and the Devils," why anybody connected with this movie thought it should be made. It is unredeemed, dreary, boring, gloomy dreck unilluminated by even the slightest fugitive moment of inspiration or ambition," though he praised star Twiggy as the film's "only ray of sunshine." Vincent Canby of the New York Times was more positive, writing the film boasts a "first-rate English cast," and adding that "Mr. Harwood's screenplay, which retains a lot of the original Thomas dialogue, is much more fun to see than the Thomas screenplay is to read."

See also
 The Greed of William Hart (1948)
 The Flesh and the Fiends (1960)
 Burke & Hare (1971)
 Burke & Hare (Comedy, 2010)

References

External links
 
 
 
 

1985 films
1985 horror films
1980s serial killer films
British horror films
British serial killer films
Body snatching
Films directed by Freddie Francis
Films produced by Mel Brooks
Films scored by John Morris
Films based on works by Dylan Thomas
Gothic horror films
Brooksfilms films
Crime films based on actual events
Films set in the 19th century
Biographical films about serial killers
Cultural depictions of William Burke and Hare
Films with screenplays by Ronald Harwood
1980s English-language films
1980s British films